Luciano Federico "Lucho" Acosta (born 31 May 1994) is an Argentine professional footballer who plays as a attacking midfielder for Major League Soccer club FC Cincinnati.

Club career

Boca Juniors
Acosta made his professional debut for Boca Juniors on 9 February 2014, when Boca tied against Newell's Old Boys, replacing Juan Manuel Martínez for the 2014 Final. Acosta appeared in the Xeneizes as a starter throughout the 2014 Torneo Final.

D.C. United
In 2016, Acosta went on a season-long loan to D.C. United of Major League Soccer. Acosta made his competitive debut on in a CONCACAF Champions League quarterfinal match against Queretaro. He scored his first goal for D.C. United in the 86th minute of a league game against the New England Revolution on April 23.

After the 2016 season, D.C. United purchased Acosta’s contract outright for a club record fee. He scored his first professional hat-trick on 13 August 2018 when playing for D.C. United against Orlando City and the match ended 3–2 in favor of D.C. United.
On 21 October 2018, Acosta provided an assist for Wayne Rooney following an outstanding dribble, and also scored himself in a 3–1 win over New York City FC which secured a play-off spot in the MLS Cup for D.C. United.

Since Wayne Rooney's arrival to D.C. United, Luciano and Wayne developed a good chemistry together in the field and provided goals and assists to each other. Their chemistry made them to be considered to one of the best duos in all of MLS. D.C. United fans nicknamed their duo "Luchoroo".

Before the 2019 season, Acosta was very close to sign for Paris Saint-Germain F.C. Sources said the offer to D.C. United was under US$10 million and Acosta was scheduled to arrive at Paris for his medical. In the 2019 MLS Season, Acosta's form was declining, and was starting to get pushed out of the first team. After the 2019 season, Acosta's contract with D.C. United ended. He played his last game for D.C. on October 19, 2019, in a MLS playoff game against Toronto FC. On November 12, 2019, Acosta told an Argentine radio channel, 'La Mano de Dios', that former D.C. teammate Wayne Rooney told him he wanted to bring him to Derby County, where Rooney was going to become player-coach in 2020.
Acosta left D.C. United at the end of the 2019 season when his contract expired.

Atlas 
On 19 December 2019, it was announced that Acosta would join Liga MX side Atlas on 1 January 2020. Acosta scored his first goal for Atlas against Tijuana on January 31, 2020.

FC Cincinnati 
On 17 March 2021, Acosta returned to Major League Soccer, joining FC Cincinnati on a three-year deal as a designated player. FC Cincinnati acquired his MLS rights from D.C. United in exchange for $250,000 in General Allocation Money plus potential future incentives. He made his debut for the club on 17 April 2021 in their opener against Nashville SC. He scored in the 8th minute as FC Cincinnati drew 2–2 away.

Career statistics

Honours
Individual
MLS Best XI: 2018, 2022
MLS All-Star: 2022

Personal
Acosta holds a U.S. green card, which qualifies him as a domestic player for MLS roster purposes.

References

External links
 

1994 births
Footballers from Buenos Aires
Association football midfielders
Boca Juniors footballers
D.C. United players
Atlas F.C. footballers
FC Cincinnati players
Argentine Primera División players
Major League Soccer players
Living people
Argentine expatriate footballers
Argentine footballers
Expatriate soccer players in the United States
Argentine expatriate sportspeople in the United States
Designated Players (MLS)